The Goldsmid Baronetcy, of St John's Lodge in the County of Surrey, was a title in the Baronetage of the United Kingdom. It was created on 15 October 1841 for Isaac Goldsmid, a financier and one of the leading figures in the Jewish emancipation in the United Kingdom. He was the first Jew to be created a baronet. He was succeeded by his son, the second Baronet. He was a barrister and sat as member of parliament for Reading. He was childless and was succeeded by his nephew, the third Baronet. He was a barrister, businessman and Liberal politician. Goldsmid had eight daughters but no sons and on his death in 1896 the title became extinct.

Goldsmid baronets, of St John's Lodge (1841)
Sir Isaac Lyon Goldsmid, 1st Baronet (1778–1859)
Sir Francis Henry Goldsmid, 2nd Baronet (1808–1878)
Sir Julian Goldsmid, 3rd Baronet (1838–1896)

See also
Goldsmid family
D'Avigdor-Goldsmid baronets
Goldsmid-Stern-Salomons baronets

References

Extinct baronetcies in the Baronetage of the United Kingdom